Andronovo is a rural locality (a village) in Nikolskoye Rural Settlement, Kaduysky District, Vologda Oblast, Russia. The population was 192 as of 2002. There are 5 streets.

Geography 
Andronovo is located 39 km north of Kaduy (the district's administrative centre) by road. Martyukhino is the nearest rural locality.

References 

Rural localities in Kaduysky District